Landmark Leisure Beach is a beach that is located in Lagos, Lagos State Nigeria. It is at numbers 3 & 4 Water Corporation Road, VI, Lagos. The beach is open to the public every day. It employed paid lifeguards who watch over the beach and have rescued many people from drowning.

Concerts 
Many concerts are staged at the Landmark Leisure Beach, especially during December. On 30 December 2021, Nigerian musician Wizkid performed at the beach. The show was organized by Toro Entertainment Company.

References 

Beaches of Lagos